The 72nd Oregon Legislative Assembly convened in January 2003 for its regular session, which on August 8 of that year surpassed the 1993 session as the longest in the U.S. state of Oregon's history. In the senate, which was evenly divided between 15 Democrats and 15 Republicans, Democratic President Peter Courtney and Republican President Pro Tempore Lenn Hannon were praised by The Oregonian for managing to avoid partisan gridlock. The House was composed of 35 Republicans and 25 Democrats.

Then-state senator Betsy Johnson cited reasons for the extended session in a legislative update: a need to revamp the state budget in the face of declining revenues, and the political dynamics of a new Democratic governor (Ted Kulongoski), a Republican-controlled House of Representatives, and the evenly divided Senate.

The legislature passed a major reform of the state public pension program, PERS, and approved the biggest state transportation investment plan in Oregon history.

In contrast with the 71st Oregon Legislative Assembly, which held five special sessions in 2002, the 72nd convened only for its regular 2003 session, and did not convene in 2004.

Senate 
The Senate was composed of 15 Democrats and 15 Republicans.

Senate members

House members
The House was composed of 25 Democrats and 35 Republicans.

References

External links
 Official overview of bills considered and passed in 2003 regular session

Oregon legislative sessions
2003 in Oregon
2004 in Oregon
2003 in American politics
2004 in American politics
2003 U.S. legislative sessions
2004 U.S. legislative sessions